Santa Maria del Soccorso is a surface station of Line B on the Rome Metro, named after the nearby church of Santa Maria del Soccorso. It is located on Via Tiburtina, at the junction with Piazza Santa Maria del Soccorso, Via del Frantoio and Via del Badile. It was opened on 8 December 1990.

External links 
The station on the ATAC site

Rome Metro Line B stations
Railway stations opened in 1990
1990 establishments in Italy
Rome Q. XXI Pietralata
Railway stations in Italy opened in the 20th century